Mythic may refer to:

 Myth, an academic term for a sacred story concerning the origins of the world 
 Mythic Entertainment, a computer game development studio

See also
 Myth (disambiguation)